Glenbranter; is a hamlet on the northwest shore of Loch Eck in the Argyll Forest Park, on the Cowal peninsula, Argyll and Bute in the West of Scotland.

Sir Harry Lauder

Sir Harry Lauder owned a house at Glenbranter, demolished in the 1960s.  There is a memorial to his son Captain John Lauder,  of the 8th Battalion Argyll & Sutherland Highlanders, in Glenbranter who died 26 December 1916, during the First World War.

Gallery

References

External links

 Argyll Forest Park, Glenbranter
 BBC World War I at Home
 Captain John Lauder, University of Edinburgh 

Villages in Cowal
Highlands and Islands of Scotland
World War II prisoner of war camps in Scotland